Francisco Sánchez Luna, known as Kiko Sánchez (born 19 September 1965) is a Spanish sailor and Olympic champion. He won a gold medal in the 470 Class at the 1992 Summer Olympics in Barcelona, together with Jordi Calafat.

References

External links

1965 births
Living people
Spanish male sailors (sport)
Olympic sailors of Spain
Sailors at the 1988 Summer Olympics – 470
Sailors at the 1992 Summer Olympics – 470
Sailors at the 1996 Summer Olympics – 470
Olympic gold medalists for Spain
Olympic medalists in sailing
Medalists at the 1992 Summer Olympics
470 class world champions
World champions in sailing for Spain
20th-century Spanish people